Northwest Italy ( or just ) is one of the five official statistical regions of Italy used by the National Institute of Statistics (ISTAT), a first level NUTS region and a European Parliament constituency. Northwest encompasses four of the country's 20 regions:

Aosta Valley
Liguria
Lombardy
Piedmont

Economy 
The Gross domestic product (GDP) of the region was 580.3 billion euros in 2018, accounting for 32.9% of Italy's economic output. GDP per capita adjusted for purchasing power was 35,900 euros or 119% of the EU27 average in the same year.

See also
 National Institute of Statistics (Italy)
 Italian NUTS level 1 regions:
 Northeast Italy
 Central Italy
 South Italy
 Insular Italy
 Northern Italy
 Southern Italy

References

Geography of Italy
NUTS 1 statistical regions of the European Union